WIOZ-FM (102.5 FM) is a radio station broadcasting an adult contemporary format. Licensed to Southern Pines, North Carolina, United States, the station is currently owned by Meridian Communications. L.L.C. and features programming from Premiere Radio Networks.

History
WIOZ-FM started out at 107.1 MHz in 1973, with a 3,000-watt signal. It was originally owned by Bill Gaston, and was, at that time, the first FM Station in Moore County. One of the first morning men was Ned Champion, who had worked at WPTF in Raleigh and was the voice of NC Department of Agriculture Farm News, distributed to various stations in NC. Music format was top 40 in morning drive time and easy listening the rest of the broadcast day. Somewhere around 1987, the station changed frequency to 106.9 MHz and the format became more easy listening. Some of the professional radio broadcasters were Rich Rushforth and Robin Duff. In 1995, WIOZ moved to 102.5 FM, which had been WAHP. The move to 102.5 meant a decrease in power from 50,000 to 6,000 watts. The switch to the current name and format came in 1999.

References

External links

IOZ-FM